The 2008 Meath Senior Football Championship was the 116th edition of the Meath GAA's premier club Gaelic football tournament for senior graded teams in County Meath, Ireland. The tournament consists of 16 teams, with the winner going on to represent Meath in the Leinster Senior Club Football Championship. The championship starts with a group stage and then progresses to a knock out stage.
 
Seneschalstown were the defending champions after they defeated Navan O'Mahonys after a replay in the previous years final.

Donaghmore/Ashbourne were promoted after claiming the 2007 Meath Intermediate Football Championship title, their first ever year in the senior grade.

This was also Duleek/Bellewstown's first year as a senior club as the clubs Duleek and Bellewstown amalgamated before the start of the championship. Duleek were a senior club while Bellewstown played in the Junior 'B' Championship.

On 11 October 2008, Navan O'Mahonys claimed their 17th Senior Championship title when they defeated Summerhill 2-12 to 0-7. Paddy Smyth lifted the Keegan Cup for O'Mahonys while former All-Star Stephen Bray claimed the 'Man of the Match' award.

Kilmainhamwood were relegated after 14 years in the senior grade.

Team changes
The following teams have changed division since the 2007 championship season.

To S.F.C.
Promoted from I.F.C.
 Donaghmore/Ashbourne  -  (Intermediate Champions)

From S.F.C.
Relegated to I.F.C.
 Ballinlough

Group stage
There are 3 groups called Group A, B and C. The 3 top finishers in Group A and the top 2 finishers in Group B and C will qualify for the quarter finals. Third place in Group B will play third place in Group C for a quarter finals place. The 3 teams that finish last in their groups will play in a round-robin relegation play off.

Group A

Round 1:
 Summerhill 1-10, 1-6 Rathkenny, Bohermeen, 25/4/2008,
 Navan O'Mahonys 1-11, 1-11 Wolfe Tones, Simonstown, 26/4/2008,
 Skryne 1-12, 0-8 Seneschalstown, Walterstown, 26/4/2008,

Round 2:
 Wolfe Tones 2-13, 1-10 Summerhill, Dunsany, 3/5/2008,
 Navan O'Mahony's 0-14, 0-10 Skryne, Dunshaughlin, 4/5/2008,
 Seneschalstown 0-10, 0-8 Rathkenny, Pairc Tailteann, 3/5/2008,

Round 3:
 Navan O'Mahony's 1-17, 0-10 Seneschalstown, Pairc Tailteann, 5/6/2008,
 Wolfe Tones 0-13, 0-9 Rathkenny, Castletown, 8/6/2008,
 Summerhill 0-16, 1-11 Skryne, Pairc Tailteann, 14/6/2008,

Round 4:
 Skryne 1-11, 0-13 Rathkenny, Seneschalstown, 22/6/2008,
 Navan O'Mahony's 0-14, 0-10 Summerhill, Pairc Tailteann, 22/6/2008,
 Wolfe Tones 1-12, 1-7 Seneschalstown, Pairc Tailteann, 22/6/2008,

Round 5:
 Navan O'Mahony's 1-14, 0-6 Rathkenny, Kilberry, 21/8/2008,
 Wolfe Tones 2-12, 2-9 Skryne, Pairc Tailteann, 20/8/2008,
 Summerhill 0-16, 2-6 Seneschalstown, Dunshaughlin, 20/8/2008,

Group B

Round 1:
 St. Peter's Dunboyne 2-15, 0-5 Walterstown, Dunshaughlin, 27/4/2008,
 St. Patrick's 2-10, 0-11 Blackhall Gaels, Dunsany, 26/4/2008,
 Simonstown Gaels  -  Bye,

Round 2:
 Blackhall Gaels 2-8, 0-8 St. Peter's Dunboyne, Summerhill, 3/5/2008, 
 Walterstown 2-7, 0-8 Simonstown Gaels, Seneschalstown, 3/5/2008,
 St. Patrick's  -  Bye,

Round 3:
 Blackhall Gaels 1-9, 2-6 Walterstown, Dunsany, 8/6/2008,
 Simonstown Gaels 1-11, 0-8 St. Patrick's, Skryne, 8/6/2008,
 St. Peter's Dunboyne  -  Bye,

Round 4:
 St. Patrick's 1-8, 1-5 Walterstown, Ashbourne, 22/6/2008,
 St. Peter's Dunboyne 0-9, 0-8 Simonstown Gaels, Dunshaughlin, 22/6/2008,
 Blackhall Gaels  -  Bye,

Round 5:
 Simonstown Gaels 1-10, 0-13 Blackhall Gaels, Walterstown, 20/8/2008,
 St. Peter's Dunboyne 1-15, 0-6 St. Patrick's, Ashbourne, 20/8/2008,
 Walterstown  -  Bye,

Group C

Round 1:
 Dunshaughlin 2-10, 2-8 Duleek/Bellewstown, Ratoath, 25/4/2008,
 Donaghmore/Ashbourne 2-15, 1-5 Kilmainhamwood, Seneschalstown, 26/4/2008, 
 Trim  -  Bye,

Round 2:
 Trim 1-14, 0-12 Kilmainhamwood, Dunderry, 4/5/2008,
 Dunshaughlin 1-7, 1-6 Donaghmore/Ashbourne, Ratoath, 4/5/2008,
 Duleek/Bellewstown  -  Bye,

Round 3:
 Duleek/Bellewstown 0-15, 0-5 Trim, Pairc Tailteann, 14/6/2008,
 Dunshaughlin 1-16, 0-11 Kilmainhamwood, Walterstown, 14/6/2008,
 Donaghmore/Ashbourne  -  Bye,
  
Round 4:
 Donaghmore/Ashbourne 1-8, 0-9 Trim, Walterstown, 20/6/2008,
 Duleek/Bellewstown 5-16, 1-4 Kilmainhamwood, Simonstown, 20/6/2008,
 Dunshaughlin  -  Bye,

Round 5:
 Dunshaughlin 0-13, 1-6 Trim, 19/8/2008,
 Duleek/Bellewstown 0-9, 0-9 Donaghmore/Ashbourne, 19/8/2008,
 Kilmainhamwood  -  Bye,

Knock-out Stage

Relegation Play Off

Game 1: Walterstown 0-12, 0-9 Kilmainhamwood, Castletown, 31/8/2008,

Game 2: Rathkenny 2-12, 0-3 Kilmainhamwood, Drumconrath, 14/9/2008,

Finals

Preliminary Quarter-Final:
 Donaghmore/Ashbourne 2-13, 1-7 St. Patrick's, Pairc Tailteann, 2/9/2008,

Quarter-Final:
 Blackhall Gaels 1-13, 0-7 Dunshaughlin, Pairc Tailteann, 7/9/2008,
 Wolfe Tones 4-7, 1-11  Duleek/Bellewstown, Pairc Tailteann, 7/9/2008,
 Navan O'Mahonys 2-12, 0-5 Donaghmore/Ashbourne, Pairc Tailteann, 9/9/2008,
 Summerhill 0-9, 0-8 St Peters Dunboyne, Pairc Tailteann, 9/9/2008,

Semi-Final:
 Navan O'Mahonys 2-13, 0-9 Blackhall Gaels, Pairc Tailteann, 27/9/2008,
 Summerhill 1-14, 2-8 Wolfe Tones, Pairc Tailteann,  28/9/2008,

Final:
 Navan O'Mahonys 2-12, 0-7 Summerhill, Pairc Tailteann, 11/10/2008,

References

External links

Meath Senior Football Championship
Meath Senior Football Championship